La sérénade interrompue is a musical composition by French composer Claude Debussy. It is the ninth of the composer's Préludes, Book I (1909–1910). The title is in French and translates to "The Interrupted Serenade".

Composition
The piece opens with an introductory passage whose chief feature is its hesitant pizzicato manner. The main theme slowly evolves, and although it is not a combative force here, it comes across as somewhat nocturnal in mood and having both nonchalance and allure in its lithe manner. The rhythmic elements appear throughout and close the piece in the same kind of hesitant fashion heard in the opening.

The piece is largely influenced by the Impressionist period of art in France during the middle-late 1800s.

Preludes by Claude Debussy
1910 compositions